German submarine U-2353 was a Type XXIII U-boat of Nazi Germany's Kriegsmarine during World War II. She was ordered on 20 September 1944, and was laid down on 10 October 1944 at Deutsche Werft AG, Hamburg, as yard number 507. She was launched on 6 December 1944 and commissioned under the command of Oberleutnant zur See Jürgen Hillmann on 9 January 1945.

Design
Like all Type XXIII U-boats, U-2353 had a displacement of  when at the surface and  while submerged. The submarine was powered by one MWM six-cylinder RS134S diesel engine providing , one AEG GU4463-8 double-acting electric motor providing , and one BBC silent running CCR188 electric motor providing .

U-2353 was fitted with two  torpedo tubes in the bow. She could carry two preloaded torpedoes. The complement was 14 – 18 men. This class of U-boat did not carry a deck gun.

Service history
On 9 May 1945, U-2353 surrendered at Kristiansand, Norway. She was later transferred to Loch Ryan, Scotland on 29 May 1945.

Post war service
The TNC allocated U-2353 to the Soviet Union. On 4 December 1945, she arrived in Libau, Latvia, as British N-class N31. On 13 February 1946, the Soviet Navy allocated her to the Baltic Fleet. She was renamed M-51 on 9 June 1949 then sent to the reserve fleet on 22 December 1950 as a training hulk. She was finally struck from the Soviet Navy on 17 March 1952, and broken up for scrap in 1963.

See also
 Battle of the Atlantic

References

Bibliography

External links

U-boats commissioned in 1945
World War II submarines of Germany
1944 ships
Type XXIII submarines
Ships built in Hamburg